Ruby Bridges is a 1998 television film, written by Toni Ann Johnson, directed by Euzhan Palcy and based on the true story of Ruby Bridges, one of the first black students to attend integrated schools in New Orleans, Louisiana, in 1960. As a six-year-old, Bridges was one of four black first-graders, selected on the basis of test scores, to attend previously all-white public schools in New Orleans. Three students were sent to McDonogh 19, and Ruby was the only black child to be sent to William Frantz Elementary School.

The film received positive reviews, and has an approval rating of 83% on Rotten Tomatoes. The film was nominated for several awards, including an NAACP Image award.  The writer, Toni Ann Johnson, won the 1998 Humanitas Prize for her teleplay.  The film also won The Christopher Award. It is currently available for streaming on Disney+.

Plot
Ruby Bridges tells the story of how a six-year old Black girl integrated a New Orleans segregated school in 1960. Of course, Ruby didn’t achieve this feat alone– there was the NAACP that chose her;  four US Marshals that kept back the angry mob of haters bent on lynching her; a kind-hearted White teacher who pushed back against her racist superiors; a famous psychiatrist to help her with the stress; and, most of all, her courageous mother who shared the deep faith that gave the girl the strength to persist.

Cast
 Chaz Monet as Ruby Bridges
 Michael Beach as Abon Bridges
 Lela Rochon as Lucielle 'Lucy' Bridges
 Penelope Ann Miller as Barbara Henry
 Kevin Pollak as Dr. Robert Coles
 Jean Louisa Kelly as Jane Coles
 Peter Francis James as Dr. Broyard 
 Toni Ann Johnson as Alma Broyard
 Patrika Darbo as Miss Spencer
 Diana Scarwid as Miss Woodmere

See also
 Civil rights movement in popular culture
 The Problem We All Live With, 1964 painting

External links
 
 https://readthespirit.com/visual-parables/ruby-bridges-1998/

1998 films
Civil rights movement in television
Films set in 1960
Films set in New Orleans
Disney television films
African-American films
African-American biographical dramas
Films directed by Euzhan Palcy
American drama television films
1990s English-language films
1990s American films